After the formation of the Scottish Football League in 1890, a number of senior football clubs set up various non-league competitions around the country. A number of these leagues were supplementary football leagues, that is they were played by clubs from various other competitions in order to create a fuller, competitive fixture list.

Senior 

 Scottish Football League
 Premier Division
 First Division
 Second Division
 Third Division
 Scottish Premier League

Non League 
 Central League
 Central Combination
 Midland League
 Northern League
 Scottish Alliance
 Scottish Combination
 Scottish Federation
 Scottish Union

Junior 
Ayrshire Junior League
 Central Junior League
 East Junior League
 Fife Junior League
 Glasgow Junior League
 Lanarkshire Junior League
 North Junior League
 Scottish Intermediate League
 Scottish Junior League

Amateur 
 Dumfries & District Amateur League
 West of Scotland Amateur League

War-time 
 North Eastern League
 Southern League
 War Emergency League

Supplementary 
 Ayrshire & Renfrewshire League
 Edinburgh / East of Scotland League
 Glasgow League
 Glasgow & West of Scotland League
 Inter City League
 Inter City Midweek League
 Inter County League
 Lanarkshire League
 Renfrewshire League
 Scottish County League

Age group

Reserve 
 Combined Reserve League
 Scottish Premier Reserve League
 Scottish Reserve Football League

Youth 
 SPFL Development League

Other 
 Ayrshire  Combination 
 Ayrshire League 
 Eastern League
 Kirkcudbrightshire League
 Stewartry League
 Western League

References 
 Scottish Football Historical Archive

Defunct football leagues in Scotland
History of football in Scotland